Cecilia Nilsson (born 22 June 1979) is a retired female hammer thrower from Sweden. She set her personal best (69.09 metres) on 24 May 2008 at a meet in Halle, Saxony-Anhalt.

Achievements

References

1979 births
Living people
Swedish female hammer throwers